Icons of Evil is the sixth album by Vital Remains. It was released in April 2007. The sample in "Where is Your God Now" is taken from the Mel Gibson film The Passion of the Christ and from William Peter Blatty's The Exorcist. Icons of Evil is the last album to feature vocalist Glen Benton and guitarist Dave Suzuki.

The album cover art is actually a modified depiction from a scene in the film The Passion of the Christ where Jesus is nailed to the cross.

Track listing

Personnel
Vital Remains
Tony Lazaro – rhythm guitar, bass
Dave Suzuki – lead guitar, drums
Glen Benton – vocals
Production
Shawn Ohtani – engineer
Erik Rutan – producer, engineer
Alan Douches – mastering
Kris Verwimp – artwork, cover art

References

2007 albums
Vital Remains albums
Century Media Records albums
Albums produced by Erik Rutan